Babar Rehman (born 14 August 1984) is a Pakistani first-class cricketer who plays for Karachi.

References

External links
 

1984 births
Living people
Pakistani cricketers
Karachi cricketers
Cricketers from Karachi